Juarez 2045 (also known as Cartel 2045) is a 2017 American science fiction action adventure film directed by Chris Le and produced by Rocky Mudaliar. It stars Danny Trejo, Brad Schmidt and Alex Heartman in lead roles. Juarez 2045 was released on April 1, 2017 in theaters in Sandy, Utah, near Salt Lake City. The film was later released on video on demand on May 1, 2018 under the title Cartel 2045.

Plot synopsis
The story is set in the year 2045. The war on drugs in Mexico has escalated as a ruthless drug Cartel use robots to enforce their operations. A Marine goes to Juárez in search for his brother who was kidnapped by a lieutenant who leads the robotic Cartel.

Cast 
 Danny Trejo as Angel Malvado 
 Brad Schmidt as Carson Wright
 Alex Heartman as Chris
 Blake Webb as Mickey
 Amy Savannah as Mila
 Flo Donelli as Carmen
 Nathan Day as Luke Hemsworth
 Mike Lopez as Drug Cartel Leader
 Casey William Walker as Technician #1
 Anthony Tefertiller as Juarez Driver
 Oscar Olivares as Gabriel Malvado

References

External links 
 
 

2017 films
American robot films
American science fiction action films
2010s adventure films
Films set in 2045
Films set in the future
Fictional artificial intelligences
Films about artificial intelligence
2017 science fiction action films
Films about Mexican drug cartels
2010s English-language films
2010s American films
2010s Mexican films